Harold I. Tyler (April 11, 1901 – November 23, 1967) was an American businessman and politician from New York.

Life
He was born on April 11, 1901, in Chittenango, Madison County, New York, the son of William I. Tyler and Grace (Dunham) Tyler. He attended Storm King School. Then he attended Central City Business Institute and Simmons School of Embalming in Syracuse, and became a funeral director, like his father. In 1928, he married Jewel Ferguson, and they had one son.

Tyler entered politics as a Republican. He was a member of the New York State Assembly from 1953 until his death in 1967, sitting in the 169th, 170th, 171st, 172nd, 173rd, 174th, 175th, 176th and 177th New York State Legislatures.

Death 
Tyler died on November 23, 1967; and was buried at the Oakwood Cemetery in Chittenango.

References

External links

1901 births
1967 deaths
People from Chittenango, New York
Republican Party members of the New York State Assembly
20th-century American politicians
Businesspeople from New York (state)